Manyasree Viswamithran is a 1974 Indian Malayalam-language satirical film, directed and produced by Madhu, and written by Kainikkara Kumara Pillai. The film stars Madhu, Sheela, Jayabharathi and Kaviyoor Ponnamma. It is based on Kainikkara Kumara Pillai's play Mathruka Manushyan. Kamal Haasan worked as dance choreographer of this film.

Plot

Cast 

Madhu as Marthandan Thampi
Sheela as Kusumam
Jayabharathi as Padmam
Kaviyoor Ponnamma as Bhagiradhiyamma
KPAC Lalitha as Naani
Adoor Bhasi as Sankaran
Sam
Sankaradi as Vakkeel
K. R. Suresh
Bahadoor as Balachandran
Kovai Rajan
M. G. Soman as Ramesh
Meena as Aluvalia
Narendran
Sudevan
Usharani

Soundtrack 
The music was composed by Shyam and the lyrics were written by P. Bhaskaran.

References

External links 
 

1970s Malayalam-language films
1970s satirical films
1974 films
Films scored by Shyam (composer)
Indian films based on plays
Indian satirical films